Francis Hyman Criss (1901 - 1973) was an American painter.  Criss's style is associated with the American Precisionists like Charles Demuth and his friend Charles Sheeler.

Biography
Criss was born in 1901 in London and immigrated with his family at age four.  He attended the Pennsylvania Academy of the Fine Arts from 1917 to 1921 on a scholarship, and later the Art Students League of New York and the Barnes Foundation, and he took private classes with Jan Matulka.  In addition to doing work for the U.S. Government under the New Deal, and contributing a mural for the Williamsburg Housing Project in Brooklyn for the Federal Art Project, Criss taught at the leftist American Artists School in the 1930s.  His pupils there included Ad Reinhardt. He also held teaching positions at numerous other institutions, including the Albright Museum School, Buffalo; the Art Students League; the New School for Social Research; and the School of Visual Arts. Criss was awarded a Guggenheim Fellowship in 1934.

The work from his best-known years, the 1930s and 1940s, is characterized by imagery of the urban environment, such as elevated subway tracks, skyscrapers, streets, and bridges.  Criss rendered these subjects with a streamlined, abstracted style, devoid of human figures, that led him to be associated with the Precisionism movement.  With distorted perspectives and dream-like juxtapositions, as in Jefferson Market Courthouse (1935), these empty cityscapes also suggest the influence of Surrealism.

A turn towards more commercial work later in his career—including a November 1942 cover for Fortune Magazine—led to a decline in his reputation. Criss died in 1973 in New York City.

HIs work is in the collections of the Brooklyn Museum, the Detroit Institute of Arts, the Philadelphia Museum of Art, the Smithsonian American Art Museum, and the Whitney Museum of American Art.

In 2021 Criss' painting Alma Sewing was featured in an essay by the art critic Sebastian Smee in the Washington Post. Smee considers Alma Sewing to be Criss' finest work. The painting in the collection of the High Museum of Art in Atlanta, Georgia.

References

External links 
 images of Criss' work from the Whitney Museum of American Art
 images of Criss' work on ArtNet
 Online Monograph

1901 births
1973 deaths
20th-century American painters
American male painters
Art Students League of New York alumni
Precisionism
Federal Art Project artists
English emigrants to the United States
20th-century American male artists